The Most Honourable Order of Omukama Chwa II Kabalega (formally: The Most Honourable Order of Duty and Inflexibility of Omukama Chwa II Kabalega and Saint Thomas More) is the third highest royal order of merit of the Kingdom of Bunyoro, and is awarded solely by the Omukama of Bunyoro. It is named in honour of Omukama (King) Chwa II Kabalega of Bunyoro, who is famous for resisting colonialism during his reign.

The Order is awarded to persons who promote charity and humanity, for acts in demonstration of the encouragement of all that makes for the spiritual and moral strengthening of mankind and Bunyoro-Kitara in particular, and to those who encourage and promote works in relief of sickness, distress, suffering or danger, without distinction of race, class or creed.

In deference to the historical characteristics of the honours system of the Bunyoro-Kitara Kingdom, the Order does not have an official motto, but its unofficial motto is “Habwomukama, Habwabantu, Habowbwinganisa” (Latin: “Pro Rex, Pro Humanitas, Pro Iustitia”; English: “For the King, For the People, For Justice”).

The Order is one of three royal orders established or reformed in 2010 as a part of a modernization process in the Kingdom, and is listed as a "Non-Ruling Dynastic Honor and Order of Merit" by the Augustan Society.

Grades 
The Order consists of seven grades, the highest of which is Grand Collar, reserved for Heads of States. Its other classes are (with post nominals):
  Grand Cross (GCCK)
  Grand Officer (GOCK)
  Commander (CCK)
  Officer (OCK)
  Knight (KCK)
  Companion (CK)

Clergy can be admitted in the ranks of Prelate Grand Gross (GCCK), Ecclesiastical Commander (ECCK), Senior Chaplain (SChCK) and Chaplain (ChCK).

References 

 
Orders, decorations, and medals of Uganda
Omukama Chwa II Kabalega
Awards established in 2010